Tammar Stein is an author of novels for young adults. Her novel Light Years has won awards including the Notable Children's Book of Jewish Content, ALA Best Books for Young Adults.

Novels
Light Years, Laurel Leaf (2008)  
High Dive, Knopf (2011)  
Kindred, Ember (2012) 
Spoils, Knopf (2013)

See also
Jewish literature

References

External links
  Author's website
  Interview on Mother Daughter Book Club.com

Year of birth missing (living people)
Living people
American children's writers
American women novelists
21st-century American women